The Northern Ireland Amateur Championship (often referred to as the Northern Ireland Championship) is an annual snooker competition. It is the most prestigious amateur event in Northern Ireland.

History

The first year of the championship was 1927, when G. Barron defeated G.R. Duff. It was not held in the years 1940 and 1942–44 due to World War II and in 1972 and 1973 because of the N. Ireland Troubles.

Many players who have appeared in the final of the tournament have gone on to be professional, most notably including two-time World Snooker Champion Alex Higgins, six-time ranking event winner Mark Allen, 25-time Irish Professional Champion Jackie Rea, World Championship semi-finalist Joe Swail, World Championship quarter-finalist Patrick Wallace (who has won the competition a record eight times) and, most recently,  ranking event winner Jordan Brown.

Other players who have gone on to be professional include Tommy Murphy, Jack McLaughlin, Martin O’Neill, Michael Duffy, Declan Hughes, Julian Logue, Joe Meara, Sean O'Neill and Dermot McGlinchey. Currently Allen and Brown are playing on the World Snooker Tour.

The current champion (2022) is Robbie McGuigan, who retained his title by defeating Rab McCullagh in the final for the second year in a row.

Winners

References

Snooker amateur competitions
Snooker competitions in Northern Ireland
Recurring sporting events established in 1927
1927 establishments in Northern Ireland